Jason Churko is a Canadian musician centered in Winnipeg, Manitoba, Canada. He is the guitarist and singer - sometimes the sole member - of the band Chords of Canada.  Churko was the former frontman for Transistor Sound & Lighting Co. and is a former member of The Paperbacks. He has made guest appearances as a guitarist on the song "Gasoline" from the album Jimson Weed by Nathan, and with Winnipeg group Boats.

References 

Living people
Canadian indie rock musicians
Musicians from Winnipeg
Year of birth missing (living people)